The Deadliest Season is a 1977 American made-for-television sports drama film aired on CBS on March 16, 1977. It was directed by Robert Markowitz, written by Ernest Kinoy and produced by Titus Productions. The film stars Michael Moriarty, Kevin Conway and Meryl Streep.

Plot
An average professional ice hockey defenseman is relegated to the minor leagues because his play is not aggressive enough. In an effort to get back to the majors, he plays dirty and gets into fights on the ice, which gets him back to the majors. His aggressive play results in the death of another player as a result of injuries sustained during a game, and results in his being charged with manslaughter. The player appears largely indifferent to the situation, appearing to view it as a normal part of playing top level ice hockey.

Cast
In The Deadliest Season, Michael Moriarty plays the main character. Kevin Conway also starred in this film. Sully Boyar, Jill Eikenberry, Walter McGinn, Andrew Duggan, Paul D'Amato and Mason Adams also appeared on The Deadliest Season. Conway played the attorney who defended Mortiarty's character. Adams' appearance as the team owner in the film helped land him a role in Lou Grant.

The film was written by Ernest Kinoy, who had already written several television dramas by that time. It was directed by Robert Markowitz, and produced by Titus Productions. Meryl Streep made her television debut. She also made her film debut role for Julia in the same year. Streep, playing Moriarty's wife, received fifth billing in what was her first role.

Airing
The Deadliest Season was a 98-minute-long courtroom and sports drama made-for-TV movie that originally aired in the United States on CBS in 1977.  In Canada, the movie aired in August 1979 on CBC. In Australia, the film first aired in November 1980, and later aired on March 23, 1982 on ATN7. In 1984, it reran in New York on Channel 2. It re-ran on television in Alaska in November 1986.

References

External links

1977 television films
1977 films
1977 drama films
1970s American films
1970s English-language films
1970s sports drama films
American drama television films
American ice hockey films
American sports drama films
CBS network films
Films directed by Robert Markowitz
Sports television films